A kadi was an official in the Ottoman Empire. The term kadi refers to judges who preside over matters in accordance with Islamic law, but in the Ottoman Empire, the kadi also became a crucial part of the central authority's administrative hierarchy. After Mehmed II codified his qanun, kadis relied on this dynastic secular law, local customs, and the sharia- Islamic divine law- to guide their rulings. Along with adjudicating over criminal and civil matters, the kadi oversaw the administration of religious endowments and was the legal guardian of orphans and others without a guardian. Although Muslims, in particular Muslim men, possessed a higher status in the kadi’s court, non-Muslims and foreigners also had access to the judicial system. Within the Ottoman's provincial administrative system, known as the timar system, the kadi served as an important check on the power of the military class. Despite the unquestioned authority of the sultan, kadis possessed a certain degree of autonomy in their rulings.

A kadis territory was called a kadiluk; there could be several kadiluks in a province (sanjak). Each sub-province or kaza, governed by a kaymakam, had a kadı (though not every kadı was assigned to one kaza, and the boundaries would shift over time).

Relation to the timar system 
The Ottoman Empire was governed through a top-down hierarchy with all authority ultimately residing with the sultan. As the empire began aggressively acquiring vast territories with diverse populations, the imperial authority adopted the timar system to rule over these lands and foster a steady source of tax revenue. Within each district, a bey from the military class carried out the sultan's executive authority while the kadi represented his legal authority. The division of power between these two authorities produced a delicate balance; the bey needed a kadi’s judgement to punish a subject, and the kadi could not carry out his own rulings. ÇSegún Amy Singer, “It was to them that peasants brought their complaints of abusive behavior suffered at the hands of the sipahis and others.” Although the kadi also often abused their authority, the division of power allowed the tax paying class to have their grievances addressed without involving the far-away imperial authority. The power vested in the kadi allowed them to protect the legitimacy of the timar system while also securing the empire's tax base.

Autonomy of the kadis 

The delegation of power to the kadi from the sultan gave the kadi certain freedoms, especially concerning their application of the law, but also reaffirmed the sultan's authority. As noted by Ronald Jennings, “The imperial authority could easily have overshadowed or smothered the authority and initiative of the kadi. The Porte appointed kadis and dismissed them at will, set the bounds of judicial administrative units, and kept in regular correspondence with its kadis. Not many kadis would have dared to tempt the imperial will, and fewer still could have withstood its wrath.” Kadis followed the orders of the sultan and his court while retaining autonomy in their rulings. Due to this autonomy, the kadis played an important role in initiating change in Ottoman jurisprudence. A kadi’s rulings did not extend beyond individual cases, but the way in which they applied laws often influenced the imperial authority's interpretation of the law. For example, judgments by kadi concerning certain cash endowments (cash-waqfs), which came under scrutiny due to the connection with interest and usury, eventually helped legitimize the practice. The extent to which a kadi could assert his own independence remains unclear, but they had enough leeway to help guide the development of Ottoman law.

References

Government of the Ottoman Empire

Ottoman law